The Argentina national junior handball team is the national under-20 handball team of Argentina. Controlled by the Argentinean Handball Confederation, that is an affiliate of the International Handball Federation and also a part of the South and Central America Handball Confederation, the team represents the country in international matches.

History

Statistics

IHF Junior World Championship record
 Champions   Runners up   Third place   Fourth place

Junior South and Central American Championship record
 Champions   Runners up   Third place   Fourth place

Squad

Notable players

References

External links
World Men's Youth Championship table
European Men's Youth Championship table

Handball in Argentina
Men's national junior handball teams
Handball